The Colonial Square Ladies Classic is an annual women's curling tournament held at the Nutana Curling Club in Saskatoon, Saskatchewan. The tournament has run since 1983 and is part of the Women's World Curling Tour. From 2012 to 2014, the Colonial Square Classic was a Grand Slam event on the women's World Curling Tour.

The event began in February 1983 as the "Mid-Winter Classic", and was billed as the "richest women's bonspiel in the world". However, it failed to attract the top names in women's curling due to competition with the Tournament of Hearts and mixed playdowns, so the event was moved to November in 1984. Despite being moved to the Fall, it kept the "Mid-Winter" name until Labatt's Lite sponsored the event in 1987.

Event names
1983-1984: Molson Mid-Winter Classic
1985-1986: Mid-Winter Curling Classic
1987: Labatt's Lite Women's Curling Classic
1988: Labatt's Lite–Canadian Airlines Ladies Classic
1989-1990: Labatt's Lite Classic
1991-1995: SunLife Ladies Curling Classic
1996-2004: Park Town Hotel Ladies Classic
2005: Park Town Ladies Curling Classic
2006: Colonial Square Ladies Curling Classic
2007–present: Colonial Square Ladies Classic

Past champions

References

 

Former Grand Slam (curling) events
Annual sporting events in Canada
Sport in Saskatoon
Women in Saskatchewan
Curling in Saskatchewan